HMS Active was a  built for the Royal Navy in the late 1860s. Launched in 1869, she entered service in 1873, and was the Commodore's ship on the Cape of Good Hope and West Africa Station. Her crew served ashore in both the Third Anglo-Ashanti and Zulu Wars. From 1885 to 1898, the ship was the flagship of the Training Squadron. Active was sold for scrap in 1906.

Description
Active displaced  and had a burthen of 2,322 tons. Her iron hull was covered by a  layer of oak that was sheathed with copper from the waterline down to prevent biofouling. Watertight transverse bulkheads subdivided the hull. Her crew consisted of 340 officers and ratings.

The ship had one 2-cylinder horizontal return connecting rod-steam engine made by Humphreys and Tennant driving a single  propeller.

The lower masts were made of iron, but the other masts were wood. Her funnel was semi-retractable to reduce wind resistance and her propeller could be hoisted up into the stern of the ship to reduce drag while under sail.

The ship was initially armed with a mix of 7-inch and 64-pounder 64 cwt rifled muzzle-loading guns. The six  guns and two of the four 64-pounders were mounted on the broadside while the other two were mounted on the forecastle and poop deck as chase guns. In 1879, ten BL 6-inch 80-pounder breech-loading guns replaced all the broadside weapons. Two carriages for  torpedoes were added as well.

Service
HMS Active was laid down in 1867 and launched on 13 March 1869. The ship was completed in March 1871 at a total cost of £126,156. Of this, £85,795 was spent on her hull and £40,361 on her machinery. Unlike her sister ship , Active was placed in reserve after completion until 1873 when she was commissioned to serve as the flagship of the Commander-in-Chief, Cape of Good Hope and West Coast of Africa Station, Commodore William Hewett. The ship participated in naval operations during the Third Anglo-Ashanti War of 1874 and some of her crew were landed to reinforce the forces ashore. Commodore Francis Sullivan replaced Hewett in 1876 and he retained command until 1879 when the ship returned home to refit.

Zulu War
The group from Active comprised 10 officers, 100 seamen, 5 idlers, 42 Marines, 14 Kroomen, and 2 medical attendants. In addition to small arms, they were equipped with two 12-pounder breech-loading guns, 24-pounder rockets, and a Gatling gun. The 12-pounders were exchanged for two of the Army's 7-pounder mountain guns before entering Zululand.

Attached to the No.1 Column commanded by Colonel Charles Pearson, they crossed the Tugela River from Natal into Zululand on 12 January 1879. On 22 January they saw action in the Battle of Inyezane, driving off an attacking force of Zulus with rockets, Martini-Henry rifles and the Gatling gun. The same day the British main force was defeated at the Battle of Isandlwana, and so Pearson's column advanced to Eshowe, where it was besieged for two months, until relieved on 3 April. In February, Active ran aground in Tugela Bay whilst assisting , which had also ran aground. They were refloated 36 hours later. During the campaign, Actives crew suffered only one man killed, and nine wounded in action against the enemy, while nine died of disease during the siege, and one man drowned while crossing the Tugela. In 1881 the South Africa Medal was awarded to those members of Actives crew that had served there.

Training Squadron

Active was rearmed and refitted in 1879 and placed in reserve until she was selected in 1885 to be the commodore's flagship in the newly formed Training Squadron. Active was the last square-rigged naval ship to leave Portsmouth Harbour under sail. She was paid off in 1898 and was sold for scrap on 10 July 1906.

A memorial to the men of Active who lost their lives during the African campaigns can be found in Victoria Park, Portsmouth.

Notes

Footnotes

Bibliography

 

 

1869 ships
Ships built in Leamouth
Corvettes of the Royal Navy
Victorian-era corvettes of the United Kingdom
Maritime incidents in February 1879